8Eight is a South Korean co-ed vocal trio group consisting of Baek Chan, Lee Hyun, and Joo Hee. On December 21, 2014, Baek Chan and Joo Hee's contracts with Big Hit Entertainment and Source Music expired and the group became temporarily disbanded.

8Eight won the first season of the television series, MBC’s Show Survival (쇼 서바이벌). They debuted on MBC’s Show! Music Core on August 25, 2007.

On October 8, 2012, member Lee Hyun enlisted for mandatory military service of five weeks of basic training followed by duty as an active soldier for 21 months.

On September 19, 2014, the group released their comeback single "Don't Go Crazy".

On January 31, 2020, Big Hit Entertainment revealed that the group would release a new single on February 7 with Bang Si-hyuk and Wonderkid as producers.

Members
 Lee Hyun (이현) – male vocalist, leader
 Baek Chan (백찬) – male vocalist, rapper
 Joo Hee (주희) – female vocalist

Discography

Studio albums

Extended plays

Singles

Soundtrack appearances

Awards

Mnet Asian Music Awards

References

External links 

K-pop music groups
Musical groups established in 2007
South Korean pop music groups
MAMA Award winners
Musical groups disestablished in 2014
Melon Music Award winners
South Korean co-ed groups